Imperium is a British-Italian TV movie series about key events and rulers of the history of the Roman Empire.

The films in the series so far are:

Imperium: Augustus (2003), a film about Caesar Augustus. Starring Peter O'Toole. 
Imperium: Nero (2004) A film about Emperor Nero.
Imperium: Saint Peter (2005)
Imperium: Pompeii (2007)
Imperium: Augustine: the Decline of the Roman Empire (2010)

See also
 Imperium (2016 film), an unrelated British-American film
 Imperium (disambiguation)

Cultural depictions of Roman emperors
Pentalogies